Biebrza National Park is a national park in Podlaskie Voivodeship, northeastern Poland, situated along the Biebrza River.

The largest of Poland's 23 national parks, the Biebrza National Park was created on September 9, 1993.

Biebrza Marshes

The Biebrza Marshes  are the most precious part of the park. Biebrza National Park protects vast and relatively untouched fenlands with a unique variety of several communities of plants, rare wetland birds, and mammals such as elk and beaver. The Biebrza wetlands as well as the Narew River valleys are very important centres for birds’ nesting, feeding and resting. In 1995 the park was designated as a wetland site of worldwide significance and is under the protection of the Ramsar Convention.

Red Marshes

The most important part of the park is Red Marsh, which is under strict protection.

The park's headquarters is located in Osowiec-Twierdza 8 village, within the grounds of the historic Osowiec Fortress from the 19th century, near Goniądz.

2020 April fires 
On April 18, 2020, a fire broke out that destroyed at least 6 thousand hectares of grass and woodland. This fire was caused by illegal grass burning. While usually the fire would have been put out with the onset of the flooding of the grassland, this year's low water level meant that the fire kept on raging until it was finally declared under control on April 26. It has been the most devastating fire since 1992.

References

External links 
 
 
 The Board of Polish National Parks
 Awarded "EDEN – European Destinations of Excellence" non traditional tourist destination 2010

National parks of Poland
Parks in Podlaskie Voivodeship
Osowiec-Twierdza
Protected areas established in 1993
Ramsar sites in Poland
1993 establishments in Poland
Alder carrs
Central European mixed forests